The following buildings were added to the National Register of Historic Places as part of the Haines City Multiple Property Submission (or MPS).

Notes

Haines City, Florida
National Register of Historic Places in Polk County, Florida
National Register of Historic Places Multiple Property Submissions in Florida